The Helyx Bridge, unofficially dubbed the DNA Bridge, is a pedestrian and bicycle overpass located in Gainesville, Florida. It crosses over U.S. Route 441 (US 441).

History
The bridge was originally built to carry rail traffic on a line that paralleled the modern day Archer Road toward what is now the Old Gainesville Depot. When the line was converted to a rail trail in the 1980s, the bridge was converted for pedestrian use, and a steel cage-like structure was installed. In 2009, the Gainesville Community Redevelopment Agency determined that a refresh would be needed to improve the structure's appearance and improve the image conveyed by what was a gateway to the city. In March 2012, construction started on a new design resembling a strand of DNA, with the bridge re-opening on Thanksgiving

Design
When the bridge was rebuilt in 2012, it was designed as a nod to Gainesville's past as a railroad town, as well as its future in the high-tech industry and the nearby University of Florida Health Science Center. Although built to resemble a strand of DNA, the structure is not a true double helix, but instead a pair of connected sine waves 180 degrees out of phase. At night, the bridge is lit by an array of LED lights

See also

References

Buildings and structures in Gainesville, Florida
Pedestrian bridges in the United States
Bridges completed in the 1980s
1980s establishments in Florida
2012 establishments in Florida
Bridges in Florida